That's the Way of the World is the sixth studio album by American band Earth, Wind & Fire, released on March 15, 1975 by Columbia Records. It was also the soundtrack for a 1975 motion picture of the same name. The album rose to No. 1 on both the Billboard 200 and Top Soul Albums charts.
That's the Way of the World has also been certified Triple Platinum in the U.S by the RIAA. In 2002, the band released live version of the album, recorded in 1975 – That's the Way of the World: Alive in '75.

Overview
That's the Way of the World was produced by both EWF leader Maurice White and Charles Stepney.
The album spent three weeks atop the Billboard 200 chart. That's the Way of the World also stayed on top of the Billboard Top Soul Albums chart for five weeks altogether.

Singles
The single, "Shining Star", reached number one on both the Billboard Hot 100 and Hot Soul Singles charts. "Shining Star" went on to win a Grammy Award for Best R&B Performance by a Duo or Group with Vocals. The album's title track reached No. 5 on the Billboard Hot Soul Singles chart and No. 12 on the Hot 100 chart.

Critical reception

Stephen Curwood of the Boston Globe said "these guys are great and this is a sound you shouldn't miss". Variety exclaimed "Earth, Wind & Fire turn their multi-voiced big soul sound loose on eight solid  numbers".
Daryl Easlea of the BBC wrote "Seen as a meditation on the rules of living, the album is nothing less than a spiritual soul masterpiece." He added "leader Maurice White synthesised all the elements of the group so far – straight-up funk, African mysticism, jazz and sublime balladry, and made a brief, focused album." Chris Albertson of Stereo Review described the band's performance as a "disco delight" and the recording itself as "excellent". Alex Henderson of Allmusic noted That's the Way of the World is "EWF's crowning achievement". Gordon Fletcher of Rolling Stone said "Lousy production works to this LP's detriment — Maurice White has surprisingly chosen to have the entire album sound hot." Fletcher added "Great tunes (particularly the dynamic "Africano") and great musicianship are not what this one lacks — hopefully the next time out White will be able to tone things down accordingly in the places where a little under-statement is appropriate." LA Weekly called the LP "Serious romantic music to wear silk bellbottom slacks to." Clarence Page of the Chicago Tribune wrote "Their new album 'That's the Way of the World' [Columbia], exploits the moods, if not the explosive instrumental power, that made their last platter 'Open Our Eyes,' a smash hit." Robert Christgau of the Village Voice found that "Here ethnomusicology and colloquial homiletics are tacked onto the funk and soul and doowop and jazz, which makes for an instructive contrast -the taped-in-Africa Matepe Ensemble, whose spontaneous laughter closes out the coda, versus Maurice White, whose humorless platitutdes prove there's more to roots than turning a mbira into an ersatz vibraphone." Vibe also proclaimed "That's the Way of the World coursed effortlessly through a myriad of genres, from rock to jazz to funk to heavy African influences".

That's the Way of the World was nominated in 1975 and 1976 for an American Music Award for Favorite Soul/R&B Album. EWF also won a Rock Music Award for That's the Way of the World in the category of Best Rhythm and Blues Album.

During 2004 That's the Way of the World was inducted into the Grammy Hall of Fame. In 2012 Rolling Stone placed the album at 486 on its list of the 500 greatest albums of all time, calling it "make-out music of the gods". For the 2020 update of the list, the album's rank climbed to number 420.

Track listing

Original issue

Personnel
 Bass – Verdine White
 Conductor – Saini Murira (track 8)
 Congas – Philip Bailey
 Drums – Fred White, Maurice White, Ralph Johnson
 Flute, Soprano saxophone, Tenor saxophone – Andrew P. Woolfolk
 Guitar – Al McKay, Johnny Graham
 Kalimba – Maurice White
 Moog synthesizer, Piano, Organ, All Keyboards – Larry Dunn
 Percussion – Al McKay, Fred White, Maurice White, Philip Bailey, Ralph Johnson, Verdine White
 Additional Saxophone – Ernie Watts
 Strings – Saini Murira & Matepe Ensemble (track 8)
 Trombone – George Bohanon
 Trumpet – Oscar Brashear
 Vocals – Maurice White, Philip Bailey, Verdine White<ref
name="Worldlegacy" />

Production
 Producer – Maurice White (Original), Leo Sacks (Reissue)
 Co-producer – Charles Stepney (Original)
 Recording Engineer – George Massenburg (1-8), Curt Wittig (8)
 Mixing – George Massenburg (1-8), Maurice White (9-13), Paul Klingberg (9-13), Leo Sacks (9-13)
 Mixed at Hollywood Sound Recorders (Hollywood, CA).
 Mastered at Kendun Recorders (Burbank, CA).
 Art Direction – Howard Fritzen
 Design – Stephen Newman and Shusei Nagaoka
 Photography – Norman Seeff
 Musical Arrangements – Earth, Wind & Fire and Charles Stepney<ref
name="Worldlegacy" />

Charts and certifications

Charts

Year-end charts

Certifications

Accolades
The information regarding accolades attributed to That's the Way of the World is adapted from acclaimedmusic.net, soultracks.com and rockhall.com.

See also
List of number-one albums of 1975 (U.S.)
List of number-one R&B albums of 1975 (U.S.)
Billboard Year-End

References

External links
That's the Way of the World on discogs.com

Earth, Wind & Fire albums
1975 albums
Albums produced by Maurice White
Albums produced by Charles Stepney
Columbia Records albums
Columbia Records soundtracks
Drama film soundtracks
Albums recorded at Sunset Sound Recorders